The Kingdom of Polonnaruwa was the Sinhalese kingdom that expanded across the island of Sri Lanka and several overseas territories, from 1070 until 1232. The kingdom started expanding its overseas authority during the reign of Parakramabahu the Great.

It had a stronghold in South India since its involvement in a civil war in the Pandya country. During this war, Pandya Nadu was seized as a province administered by the military of Polonnaruwa. The tributaries of the Chola empire, Tondi and Pasi, also came under its military rule.  Rameshwaram was under Sinhalese rule until 1182.  Its currency Kahapana was struck in these provinces. During the occupation of South India, construction works were undertaken.

Despite being a kingdom, it had been under the control of its royal military, which captured power twice and remained dominant in politics. Other militaries also had captured power in the kingdom. The kings of Polonnaruwa also had to crush rebellions from several parts of the country, including the Kingdom of Ruhuna under Sugala.

Following the capture of the kingdom's capital Polonnaruwa by Hindu invader Kalinga Magha, who established himself in there, a new Buddhist kingdom was established in Dambadeniya, while the city of Polonnaruwa was recaptured in an invasion, it was not reestablished as the capital.

History
After ruling the country for over 1,400 years, the Kingdom of Anuradhapura fell in 1017 to the Chola King Rajaraja and his son Rajendra, who took King Mahinda V as a prisoner of war to Tamil Nadu; he died there in 1029. The Cholas shifted the capital from Anuradhapura to Polonnaruwa and ruled for nearly 53 years. Polonnaruwa was named Jananathapuram by the Cholas. King Vijayabahu I (or Kitti) eventually defeated the Cholas and re-established the Sinhalese monarchy. Polonnaruwa had always been considered an important settlement in the island, as it commanded the crossings of the Mahaveli River towards Anuradhapura.

3 years after restoring Anuradhapura, Vijayabahu prepared to fight a possible invasion. He moved the capital out of Anuradhapura to a more defensive position, Polonnaruwa. After the victory at Polonnaruwa, Vijayabahu had to face more rebellions. This caused him to delay his coronation, which took place in 1072 or 1073, eighteen years after being crowned as Vijayabahu in Ruhuna, and after a military campaign that lasted seventeen years. Polonnaruwa was renamed Vijayarajapura and chosen as the capital. The coronation ceremony was held in a palace built for this purpose in Anuradhapura, the former capital of the country. Vijayabahu married Lilavati, the daughter of Jagatipala of Kanauj, as his queen. He later married Tilokasundari, a princess from Kalinga, with the view of strengthening ties with the Kalingas.

Succession war
Vijayabahu's death left a disputed throne; the absolute successor Parakramabahu I was only selected after a war between the claimants to the throne.

Firstly, he entered secret negotiations with Gajabahu's military chief, but these attempts to capture power failed. He then sent the army of Dakkhinadesa to capture Rajarata, but he was introduced to Manabaraha, who allied with Gajabahu. Despite the setback, he captured Rajarata. Gajabahu, his army weakened, found himself in a battle against Manabharana as well. He later declared that he had passed over Rajarata to Parakramabahu of Dakkhinadesa. Manabharana was also defeated.

Parakramabahu

Following the end of the Kalinga-Arya conflict, Parakramabahu I, unified the three principalities: Rohana, Malaya, and Rajarata; declaring the islandwide Dakkhinadesa, he formed the Polonnaruwa kingdom in the latter. His reign saw the expansion of the kingdom, leading raids and large-scale invasions against his opponents. He launched an invasion against the kings of Ramanna (currently lower Burma) due to their acts of hostility, such as the kidnapping of a princess by Narathu's son Narapatisithu. In this invasion, he captured the Burmese city Bassein.

After Parakramabahu
Following the death of Parakramabahu, Vijayabahu II ascended the throne. He called Nissanka Malla to visit the country and take the throne. Vijayabahu II was, however, killed by the invader Mahinda VI.

Nissanka Malla assassinated Mahinda VI and justified his killing by claiming he was the rightful ancestor of Vijaya Singha.

Kingdom

Agriculture
Starting from the era of Parakramabahu I, there was great interest in irrigation. He ordered:

Mass tanks were built for this purpose. Some of his notable works are the Parakrama Samudra and the Giritale tank. These works surpassed what existed during the Anuradhapura period. Previously built dams were largely renovated during this period.

Demographics

The Sinhalese accounted for the majority, and the Sinhalese language was the common language. Settlements from Cambodia are recorded, the Khmer settled in an area called Kambojavâsaĺa. The Khmer script was used to write Pali texts such as the Khmer script version of the Mahavamsa.

Trade
Most trade was carried out through the main seaports of the principality, Kalpitiya, Halaavatha (Chilaw) and Colombo.

Coinage

The coins, which were mostly made of copper, were modelled after their ruler. While gold coins also existed within the kingdom and were used, they largely disappeared in the very last days of Parakramabahu I. This may have been due to an economic crisis caused by the burden. It is to be noted that the coinage of Polonnaruwa shows a great resemblance to that of RajaRaja I of the Chola kingdom. The Setu coins found in South India are also likely from the kingdom of Polonnaruwa, as the Chola or Pandya kingdoms had no reason to use these.

Trade with the Chinese dynasties was extensively high at the period, and coins belonging to the Song dynasty have been found throughout Polonnaruwa.

Meanwhile, in its colonial territories in South India, the Kahapana currency was used.

Technology and structures

The ancient Sinhalese civilization was technologically advanced. The irrigation technology of Polonnaruwa was much similar to the Anuradhapura period ones but was even more advanced. 
James Emerson Tennent writes:

Divine architecture ranging from larger dams to artificial seas, such as the Parakrama Samudra, always required advanced technology and were built in unique ways.

Vatedage

The Vatadages were built since the Anuradhapura period, however, the peak was reached during the Polonnaruwa period. The Polonnaruwa Vatadage is considered the "ultimate creation" out of all Vatadages. A Vatedage is built for the protection of a small stupa. The structure has two stone platforms decorated with elaborate stone carvings. The lower platform is entered through a single entrance facing the north, while the second platform can be accessed through four doorways facing the four cardinal points. The upper platform, surrounded by a brick wall, contains the stupa. Four Buddha statues are seated around it, each facing one of the entrances. Three concentric rows of stone columns had also been positioned here, presumably to support a wooden roof. The entire structure is decorated with stone carvings. Some of the carvings at the Polonnaruwa Vatadage, such as its sandakada pahanas, are considered to be the best examples of such architectural features. Although some archaeologists have suggested that it also had a wooden roof, this theory is disputed by others.

Nissanka Malla reign

The Hatedage and Nissanka Latha Mandapaya were built by Nissanka Malla (1187-1197) to store the relics. Several relics including relics of the Tooth of Buddha and Rice Bowls used by the Buddha are said to have been held in the Hatadage. Several historical sources including the Rajaveliya, Poojavaliya and the Galpotha inscription itself mention that it was built in sixty hours. Since the Sinhalese word Hata means sixty and Dage means relic shrine, it is possible that the structure was named Hatadage to commemorate this feat. Another theory is that it is so named because it held sixty relics.

Despite having built many structures, Nissanka Malla's major intention was to outdo the works of Parakramabahu I. He also built a statue of himself.

Military (1153–1186)

Parakramabahu organized the military of the kingdom. There were auxiliary forces made up mostly of other Buddhist ethnicities.

Ground forces
There were several branches of the ground forces of Polonnaruwa of Parakramabahu. The Culawamsa suggests that the strength may have been as many as 100,000 during the 1140s prior to the first battle of Rajarata. Its strength during the Pandyan war is not said, however, it may have been numerous as well. The ground forces could be divided between the main armies led by Lankapura Dandanatha and the auxiliary forces made up mostly of minorities.

Army
The armies of Parakramabahu in the early days were led by Rakkha. There were other important generals who Parakramabahu dispatched in order to reinforce Rakkha fighting the forces of Ruhunan separatists.

Auxiliaries
The auxiliary units were used to reinforce the Sinhalese army on multiple occasions. These units were largely made up of Buddhist minorities, and tribals.

Naval forces
The first navy was organized in 1165. This was used for the invasion of Burma.

Fall
Following the death of Kalinga Lokeshvara, his son Vira Bahu I took up power. However, he was killed by the military commander Tavuru Senavirat. A period of 
military rule was followed by the ascension of Vikramabahu I; who was assassinated by a nephew of Kalinga Lokeshvara, Chodaganga. The military once again organized a coup and arrested Chodaganga. The military became more dominant, ousting the monarchy; as a result, king Anikanga appealed for support from the Cholas. An army was sent, and Anikanga ascended the throne. The three month-old Dharmásoka of Polonnaruwa was slaughtered along with the commander of the Polonnaruwa Royal Army.

The military once again seized power, and Lilavati was installed on the throne. She was ousted by Lokissara, a military commander. The Royal Army, being a rival to Lokissara's forces, killed him.

Sacking of Lilavati
Parakrama Pandyan II from Pandyan Kingdom invaded Polonnaruwa, thus forcing Lilavati into exile. Parakrama Pandyan II ascended the throne, reigned between 1212 and 1215 CE. He was ousted by the invader, Kalinga Magha, who in the aftermath founded the Jaffna kingdom. Kalinga Magha ruled for 21 years until he was also expelled from Polonnaruwa in 1236, with an invasion from the south.

Succession
After defeating and expelling Kalinga Magha from Polonnaruwa, Vijayabahu III moved the capital to Dambadeniya. He founded the House of Sri Sanga Bo.

Religion
Buddhism continued to be the main religion in the Polonnaruwa era. Its monarchs enjoyed the exchange of religious jewels and other expensive items with the Theravada Buddhist kings of Siam, Burma, and Kampuchea. Prior to the Buddhist kings' takeover, there was a strong influence of Hinduism caused by Cholas. It is evident from the removal of cow shape in Polonnaruwa moonstone, and also by the presence of Shiva temples in Polonnaruwa. After Chola rule, many viharas were renovated by Vijayabahu I and his successor Parakramabahu I.

Buddhism
The primary form of Buddhism practiced in the Polonnaruwa kingdom was the orthodox school of Buddhism; following religious reforms in Burma, many monks there aligned themselves with the Polonnaruwan monks.

Distribution to Cambodia

Khmer King Jayavarman VII sent his son Tamalinda to Polonnaruwa to be ordained as a Buddhist monk and study Theravada Buddhism according to the Pali scriptural traditions. Tamalinda then returned to the Angkor, and promoted Buddhist traditions according to the Theravada training he had received, galvanizing the long-standing Theravada presence that had existed throughout the Angkor for centuries.

Gallery

See also
Polonnaruwa period
List of Sri Lankan monarchs
Kalinga (historical region)
Siri Parakum

Notes

Citations

Sources

Further reading
von Schroeder, Ulrich. (1990). Buddhist Sculptures of Sri Lanka. (752 p.; 1620 illustrations). Hong Kong: Visual Dharma Publications, Ltd. 
von Schroeder, Ulrich. (1992). The Golden Age of Sculpture in Sri Lanka - Masterpieces of Buddhist and Hindu Bronzes from Museums in Sri Lanka, [catalogue of the exhibition held at the Arthur M. Sackler Gallery, Washington, D. C., 1 November 1992 – 26 September 1993]. Hong Kong: Visual Dharma Publications, Ltd.

External links
Polonnaruwa. www.ancientworlds.com

 
Overseas empires
Kingdoms of Sri Lanka
Former countries in South Asia
1017 establishments in Asia
11th-century establishments in Sri Lanka
States and territories established in 1017
1310 disestablishments in Asia
14th-century disestablishments in Sri Lanka
States and territories disestablished in 1310
Former monarchies of South Asia